Egglemont is a heritage-listed residence at 11 Cranbrook Avenue, Cremorne, North Sydney Council, New South Wales, Australia. It was built from 1916 to 1918. It is also known as Esslemont. It was added to the New South Wales State Heritage Register on 2 April 1999.

History
Egglemont was built in  / 1918 in the Californian Bungalow style with a garden typical of that period. It is a four bedroom house. In latter years the property was owned by property developer Michael and Kimberley McGurk. Michael McGurk was murdered outside the property in September 2009. The property was sold in October 2011.

Description

Site
Egglemont relates well to the adjacent house by Alexander Stuart Jolly and to other houses in the Cranbrook Avenue group. It is a significant element of the Cranbrook Avenue Group, relating well to the adjacent house by A. S. Jolly and other houses in the group. The area has unfortunately been degraded in the 1970s by red brick multi-storey flat developments. The house is sited on a sloping site on Cranbrook Avenue, Cremorne, with a low, stepped wall (plastered masonry) facing the footpath, stone walls flanking a low wide paired "wide lattice" form timber gate and crazy-paved sandstone path to the front door, large shrubs (Viburnum odoratissimum, pruned into a hedge) providing some screening from the street. To either side of the main pedestrian entry gate the name "Esslemont" is carved into the top course of sandstone boundary wall blocks.

A crazy paved sandstone pedestrian path approaches the front door, which is accessed up a flight of wide stairs. Planter beds are at the base of the stairs, and abut the base of the house's walls. A secondary pedestrian gate (Art Deco iron, flanked by stone pillars) is on the uphill side of the house. It abuts, (on its uphill side again) a paved tennis court and high (steel pipe and wire netting) fence which runs up to the house and to the street wall. At the rear of the tennis court fence is a lawn area and an outbuilding (a single garage) with a sloping roof, abutting the uphill side boundary.

On the uphill side of the tennis court are a multi-storey late-mid-20th century block of flats (Rosz & Howard et al., 2001 photographs). As well as the tennis court the property has a swimming pool. At the rear of the house is a small flat lawn area with shrubs and a ground cover of cast-iron plant (Aspidistra elatior) up against the house's rear wall. The garden contains an elevated tennis court. To the back of the house is a three-storey red brick mid-20th century block of flats. The garden is typical of the period.

House
The house was built -18 and is one of the best examples of an early Californian Bungalow style house in Australia. IThe proportions, materials and craftsmanship are typical of the early examples of the style.

The house is large and contains a billiard room, large sunroom, dressing room and ensuite bathroom to the main bedroom, kitchen, laundry and scullery configured for use by domestic staff. The house is little altered in the past 60 years with the exception of extension of Bedroom 3 into the northern verandah and kitchen cupboards installed in the 1960s. The laundry contains early (probably original) china laundry double tubs and pedestals and a copper and finishes (photo 41), which are to be removed.

It comprises a large and low set single storey residence (c.1916/ 1918) in Californian Bungalow style. It has a low pitched spreading roof and gables supported on heavy timber beams, with small leadlight windows above rough dressed stone walls and massive circular verandah piers.

The original laundry was in the southwestern corner of the house.

Modifications and dates 
 - Leighton's Green' hybrid cypress (x Cuprocyparis leylandii 'Leighton's Green') hedge planted on boundary facing 13 Cranbrook Avenue - a block of flats.
2011 - NSW Land & Environment Court Tree Dispute application over the above hedge from the Strata Title flat neighbours. Application withdrawn after consultation.

Heritage listing 
Egglemont was listed on the New South Wales State Heritage Register on 2 April 1999.

See also 

Australian residential architectural styles

References

Bibliography

Attribution 

New South Wales State Heritage Register
Cremorne, New South Wales
Houses in Sydney
Articles incorporating text from the New South Wales State Heritage Register
Houses completed in 1918
1918 establishments in Australia